New Delhi is the capital city of India. 

New Delhi may also refer to:

 New Delhi district, a district of India
 New Delhi (1956 film), a Hindi film
 New Delhi (1987 film), a Malayalam film
 New Delhi (1988 Hindi film), a Hindi film
 New Delhi (1988 Kannada film), a Kannada film
 New Delhi, Illinois, an unincorporated community in the United States
 New Delhi, a metonym for the Government of India